

Kaumaram is a Hindu denomination that primarily venerates the Hindu deity of war, Kartikeya, also known as Kumaran, Murugan (in South India), Arumugan, and Subrahmanyan. Devotees of Kumaran, called Kaumaras, also revere members of his family: Parvati, Shiva, and Ganesha, as well his consorts, Devasena and Sundaravalli, the daughters of Vishnu in Tamil tradition. The important theological texts relating to Kumara are a part of the Shaiva agama canon. This sub-tradition is found among the Tamils, Kannadigas, and the Vedda, in South India, Sri Lanka, and among the Tamil diaspora worldwide. The love story of Kumara/Murugan and his wife Valli, a girl from a local tribe, is popular in Tamil Nadu, where Kumara acquired the status of a national god.

Legend 
According to the Kanda Puranam, Kartikeya was the second son of Shiva and Parvati, and the elder brother to Ganesha. According to the Puranic sources, he incarnated as six sparks emanating from the third eye of Shiva.

In a legend, Shiva pretends to forget the significance of the mantra Om and asks a young Kartikeya. The young boy astounds everyone by showing Shiva that it is the source of all creation. This earns him the epithet swaminathan, to indicate that he outdid his father.

Worship 

Tamil Nadu has six primary temples for Kartikeya that are known by the name Arupadai Veedu, which that translates roughly as "the Six Stations".

Modes of worship include kavadi that is a form of dance, alagu which is a sharp piece of metal that one pierces on the body, carrying milk and water on the heads to offer to the deity and involves a sattvik diet.

Thaipusam is an occasion that is celebrated in Kaumaram. This is much more prevalent in the Murugan Temple in Malaysia. Another chief period of worship is the Shashti. This is a period of six days when villages in South India with primary Kartikeya deities come together for a celebration. The people involved take a vow on following a vegetarian diet for the period. The six days portray events from the life of Kartikeya. The chief parts covered are the ceremonies in which he is awarded the spear Vel by his mother Shakthi, the killing of the asura Surapadman, and his wedding to Valli.

Other than this, Karnataka, that is another prominent place for Kaumaras, would have its own mode of worship. Trekking the Kumara Parvatha where he is believed to have attained mukti giving up his life is popular although not essentially in a very traditional manner.

Literature and arts 
According to local legends and Tamil folklore, Kartikeya is regarded as a veteran and a guardian of the language that is believed to have been founded by the sage Agastya, with the blessings of Kartikeya. He is considered the patron of the Tamils, due to his worship being widespread among those of Tamil descent.

The primary works in Sanskrit related to Kaumaram are Skanda Puranam detailing the history of Kartikeya and Kumārasambhava, a poem by the Sanskrit scholar Kalidasa, that literally translates as "The Creation of Kumara" or "the Creation of the Son/Boy".

Adi Shankara wrote a piece on Kartikeya called Subramanya Bhujangam .

In Tamil, abundant literature is to be found both in the classical texts and in the folklore. The Skanda Puranam was translated into Tamil. Chief contributors to the classical Tamil texts include Arunagirinathar who wrote hymns of praise with complicated grammar patterns and alliteration and onomatopoeia.

Tamil folk music have hymns written praising the beauty and bravery of Kartikeya. Another chiefly written topic is the way he fell in love and converted his bride Valli. There is a dedicated tune called "Kavadi Sindhu" that is usually used to sing such hymns. This tune became associated with celebrations and dances.

See also
 Arunagirinathar
 Deivayanai
 Idumban
 Mayura (mythology)
 Six Abodes of Murugan
 Vel

Notes

References

External links

Murugan devotion 
Murugan devotion, Temples, Songs, Festivals 
ST Temple, Dedicated to Murugan, Singapore

 
Hindu denominations
Monotheistic religions